Thaa may refer to:

Ṯāʾ, third letter of the modern Arabic alphabet
Tha (film), an Indian film
Thaa Atoll, an administrative division of the Maldives
Tāna (character), the 13th consonant of the Thaana abugaida used in Dhivehi